Jack Greenwood (born 4 August 1999), is an Australian professional footballer who plays as a goalkeeper for Western Sydney Wanderers.

References

External links

1999 births
Living people
Australian soccer players
Association football goalkeepers
Western Sydney Wanderers FC players
A-League Men players
National Premier Leagues players